The 1992 NCAA Division II football season, part of college football in the United States organized by the National Collegiate Athletic Association at the Division II level, began in August 1992, and concluded with the NCAA Division II Football Championship on December 12, 1992, at Braly Municipal Stadium in Florence, Alabama, hosted by the University of North Alabama.

The Harlon Hill Trophy was awarded to Ronald Moore, running back from Pittsburg State.

Conference and program changes

Conference changes
Following the 1991 season, the Missouri Intercollegiate Athletic Association changed its name to the Mid-America Intercollegiate Athletics Association after further expanding into Kansas with Emporia State.

Conference standings

Conference summaries

Postseason

The 1992 NCAA Division II Football Championship playoffs were the 20th single-elimination tournament to determine the national champion of men's NCAA Division II college football. The championship game was held at Braly Municipal Stadium in Florence, Alabama, for the seventh time.

Playoff bracket

See also
1992 NCAA Division I-A football season
1992 NCAA Division I-AA football season
1992 NCAA Division III football season
1992 NAIA Division I football season
1992 NAIA Division II football season

References